The Winnipeg Blues are a Manitoba Junior Hockey League team based in Oak Bluff, a suburban area of Winnipeg, Manitoba, Canada.  The team was founded in 1930 as the Winnipeg Monarchs and also formerly known as the Fort Garry Blues (1978-1984) and Winnipeg South Blues (1984-2010).

The Blues/Monarchs hockey club has won 17 Turnbull Cups as MJHL champions, two ANAVET Cups, and six Abbott Cups.  The Monarchs were also three-time Memorial Cup champions before the reorganization of Canadian junior hockey in 1970.  The 1995 Winnipeg South Blues have been inducted into the Manitoba Hockey Hall of Fame under the team category.

History

Winnipeg Monarchs (1930–1978)

The Winnipeg Monarchs won the Memorial Cup as Canadian junior hockey champions three times: in 1935, 1937 and 1946. In 1946, George Robertson scored the winning goal in the seventh game of the 1946 Memorial Cup Final before a sell out crowd at Maple Leaf Gardens in Toronto, Ontario. The Monarchs were also finalists in 1932, losing to Sudbury Wolves in the final, and 1951, losing to the Barrie Flyers.

In addition to the three Memorial Cup titles, the Monarchs won ten Turnbull Cups as MJHL champions and five Abbott Cups as Western Canadian junior hockey champions.

Winnipeg Blues (1978–present)
The Monarchs were sold and relocated to the Century Arena in Fort Garry in 1978 and adopted a new name, the Fort Garry Blues.  The team rebranded itself as the Winnipeg South Blues in 1984.  The Blues captured six league championships while playing out of Fort Garry.

The Blues moved into the new MTS Iceplex in 2010 and shortened their name to the Winnipeg Blues.  The team won its 17th Turnbull Cup in 2014 and made their only Western Canada Cup appearance that year.

In April 2019, the MJHL Board of Governors approved the sale of the team to 50 Below Sports + Entertainment Inc, owners of the Western Hockey League's Winnipeg Ice.  The Blues relocated to The Rink Training Centre in the Rural Municipality of Macdonald for the 2019–20 season. 

The Blues were the sole Junior "A" club based in the Winnipeg area after the Winnipeg Saints relocated to Virden in 2012.  They were joined by the Winnipeg Freeze, also owned by 50 Below Sports + Entertainment Inc, for the 2020–21 season.

List of championships

Season-by-season record
Note: GP = Games Played, W = Wins, L = Losses, T = Ties, OTL = Overtime Losses, GF = Goals for, GA = Goals against

Playoffs
1971 Lost Quarter-final
St. James Canadians defeated Winnipeg Monarchs 4-games-to-2
1972 Lost Quarter-final
St. James Canadians defeated Winnipeg Monarchs 4-games-to-2
1973 DNQ
1974 DNQ
1975 DNQ
1976 Lost Quarter-final
West Kildonan North Stars defeated Assiniboine Park Monarchs 4-games-to-1
1977 DNQ
1978 DNQ
1979 DNQ
1980 Lost Quarter-final
St. James Canadians defeated Fort Garry Blues 4-games-to-2
1981 Lost Quarter-final
St. James Canadians defeated Fort Garry Blues 4-games-to-1
1982 Won League, Won Turnbull Cup, Lost Anavet Cup
Fort Garry Blues defeated Kenora Thistles 4-games-to-none
Fort Garry Blues defeated St. Boniface Saints 4-games-to-none
Fort Garry Blues defeated Dauphin Kings 4-games-to-none MJHL CHAMPIONS
Fort Garry Blues defeated Flin Flon Bombers (NJHL) 3-games-to-none TURNBULL CUP CHAMPIONS
Prince Albert Raiders (SJHL) defeated Fort Garry Blues 4-games-to-2
1983 Lost Semi-final
Fort Garry Blues defeated St. James Canadians 4-games-to-none
St. Boniface Saints defeated Fort Garry Blues 4-games-to-2
1984 Lost Semi-final
Fort Garry Blues defeated St. James Canadians 4-games-to-1
Kildonan North Stars defeated Fort Garry Blues 4-games-to-2
1985 Lost Final
Winnipeg South Blues defeated Kildonan North Stars 4-games-to-none
Winnipeg South Blues defeated St. James Canadians 4-games-to-1
Selkirk Steelers defeated Winnipeg South Blues 4-games-to-1
1986 Won League, Won Anavet Cup, Lost Abbott Cup
Winnipeg South Blues defeated Thunder Bay Hornets 4-games-to-none
Winnipeg South Blues defeated St. James Canadians 4-games-to-none
Winnipeg South Blues defeated Selkirk Steelers 4-games-to-none MJHL CHAMPIONS
Winnipeg South Blues defeated Humboldt Broncos (SJHL) 4-games-to-3 ANAVET CUP CHAMPIONS
Penticton Knights (BCJHL) defeated Winnipeg South Blues 4-games-to-1
1987 Lost Final
Winnipeg South Blues defeated St. James Canadians 4-games-to-none
Winnipeg South Blues defeated St. Boniface Saints 4-games-to-none
Selkirk Steelers defeated Winnipeg South Blues 4-games-to-3
1988 Won League, Lost Anavet Cup
Winnipeg South Blues defeated Kildonan North Stars 4-games-to-none
Winnipeg South Blues defeated St. James Canadians 4-games-to-2
Winnipeg South Blues defeated Portage Terriers 4-games-to-none MJHL CHAMPIONS
Notre Dame Hounds (SJHL) defeated Winnipeg South Blues 4-games-to-none
1989 Won League, Lost Anavet Cup
Winnipeg South Blues defeated St. James Canadians 4-games-to-1
Winnipeg South Blues defeated Kildonan North Stars 4-games-to-none
Winnipeg South Blues defeated Selkirk Steelers 4-games-to-none MJHL CHAMPIONS
Humboldt Broncos (SJHL) defeated Winnipeg South Blues 4-games-to-1
1990 Lost Quarter-final
St. James Canadians defeated Winnipeg South Blues 4-games-to-none
1991 Lost Final
Winnipeg South Blues defeated Neepawa Natives 4-games-to-none
Winnipeg South Blues defeated St. James Canadians 4-games-to-1
Winkler Flyers defeated Winnipeg South Blues 4-games-to-none
1992 Lost Semi-final
Winnipeg South Blues defeated St. Boniface Saints 4-games-to-2
St. James Canadians defeated Winnipeg South Blues 4-games-to-none
1993 Lost Semi-final
Winnipeg South Blues defeated St. James Canadians 4-games-to-2
St. Boniface Saints defeated Winnipeg South Blues 4-games-to-1
1994 Lost Quarter-final
St. James Canadians defeated Winnipeg South Blues 4-games-to-3
1995 Won League, Won Anavet Cup, Won Abbott Cup, Lost 1995 Centennial Cup semi-final
Winnipeg South Blues defeated St. James Canadians 4-games-to-1
Winnipeg South Blues defeated Kildonan North Stars 4-games-to-none
Winnipeg South Blues defeated Selkirk Steelers 4-games-to-none MJHL CHAMPIONS
Winnipeg South Blues defeated Weyburn Red Wings (SJHL) 4-games-to-2 ANAVET CUP CHAMPIONS
Third in 1995 Centennial Cup round robin (2-2) ABBOTT CUP CHAMPIONS
Gloucester Rangers (CJHL) defeated Winnipeg South Blues 4-1 in semi-final
1996 Lost Semi-final
Winnipeg South Blues defeated St. Boniface Saints 4-games-to-3
St. James Canadians defeated Winnipeg South Blues 4-games-to-none
1997 Lost Quarter-final
St. James Canadians defeated Winnipeg South Blues 4-games-to-1
1998 Lost Semi-final
Winnipeg South Blues defeated St. Boniface Saints 4-games-to-3
St. James Canadians defeated Winnipeg South Blues
1999 Lost Final
Winnipeg South Blues defeated Selkirk Steelers 4-games-to-1
Winnipeg South Blues defeated St. Boniface Saints 4-games-to-3
OCN Blizzard defeated Winnipeg South Blues 4-games-to-none
2000 Lost Final
Winnipeg South Blues defeated Selkirk Steelers 4-games-to-2
Winnipeg South Blues defeated Winkler Flyers 4-games-to-1
OCN Blizzard defeated Winnipeg South Blues 4-games-to-1
2001 Lost Semi-final
Winnipeg South Blues defeated Winnipeg Saints 4-games-to-3
Winkler Flyers defeated Winnipeg South Blues 4-games-to-none
2002 Lost Quarter-final
St. James Canadians defeated Winnipeg South Blues 4-games-to-3
2003 Lost Semi-final
Winnipeg South Blues defeated Selkirk Steelers 4-games-to-2
Southeast Blades defeated Winnipeg South Blues 4-games-to-1
2004 Lost Quarter-final
Selkirk Steelers defeated Winnipeg South Blues 4-games-to-3
2005 Lost Semi-final
Winnipeg South Blues defeated Winkler Flyers 4-games-to-1
Selkirk Steelers defeated Winnipeg South Blues 4-games-to-3
2006 Won League, Lost Anavet Cup
Winnipeg South Blues defeated Winkler Flyers 4-games-to-1
Winnipeg South Blues defeated Selkirk Steelers 4-games-to-none
Winnipeg South Blues defeated OCN Blizzard 4-games-to-1 MJHL CHAMPIONS
Yorkton Terriers (SJHL) defeated Winnipeg South Blues 4-games-to-1
2007 Lost Quarter-final
Winnipeg Saints defeated Winnipeg South Blues 4-games-to-3
2008 Lost Quarter-final
Winnipeg Saints defeated Winnipeg South Blues 4-games-to-1
2009 DNQ
2010 Lost Quarter-final
Winnipeg Saints defeated Winnipeg South Blues 4-games-to-none
2011 DNQ
2012 Lost Semi-final
Winnipeg Blues defeated Winkler Flyers 4-games-to-none
Portage Terriers defeated Winnipeg Blues 4-games-to-2
2013 Lost Semi-final
Winnipeg Blues defeated Winkler Flyers 4-games-to-2
Steinbach Pistons defeated Winnipeg Blues 4-games-to-2
2014 Won League,  Lost in 2014 Western Canada Cup round robin
Winnipeg Blues defeated Winkler Flyers 2-games-to-0
Winnipeg Blues defeated Selkirk Steelers 4-games-to-1
Winnipeg Blues defeated Steinbach Pistons 4-games-to-1
Winnipeg Blues defeated Dauphin Kings 4-games-to-1 MJHL Champions
Fifth and eliminated from Western Canada Cup round robin (1-3)
2015 Lost Semi-final
Winnipeg Blues defeated Swan Valley Stampeders 4-games-to-0
Steinbach Pistons defeated Winnipeg Blues 4-games-to-1
2016 Lost Semi-final
Winnipeg Blues defeated Virden Oil Capitals 4-games-to-3
Portage Terriers defeated Winnipeg Blues 4-games-to-0
2017 Lost Quarter-final
OCN Blizzard defeated Winnipeg Blues 4-games-1
2018 Lost Semi-final
Winnipeg Blues defeated Portage Terriers 4-games-to-2
Steinbach Pistons defeated Winnipeg Blues 4-games-to-2
2019 Lost Quarter-final
Steinbach Pistons defeated Winnipeg Blues 4-games-to-2
2020 Lost Quarter-final
Steinbach Pistons defeated Winnipeg Blues 4-games-to-0
2021 Playoffs cancelled
2022 Lost Quarter-final
Winkler Flyers defeated Winnipeg Blues 4-games-to-2

NHL alumni

Retired numbers
3 - Grant Ledyard

See also
List of ice hockey teams in Manitoba

References

External links
Winnipeg Blues Official Website
1995 Winnipeg South Blues at Manitoba Hockey Hall of Fame

Ice hockey teams in Winnipeg
Manitoba Junior Hockey League teams